A list of films produced in Egypt in 1989. For an A-Z list of films currently on Wikipedia, see :Category:Egyptian films.

External links
 Egyptian films of 1989 at the Internet Movie Database
 Egyptian films of 1989 elCinema.com

Lists of Egyptian films by year
1989 in Egypt
Lists of 1989 films by country or language